Jagraj Singh Mann is an Indian athlete. He won a gold medal and silver medal in Shot put in the Asian Championships in Athletics in 1973 and 1975.

References

Indian male shot putters
Recipients of the Dhyan Chand Award
Living people
Year of birth missing (living people)